Derek Edge (14 February 1942 – 23 October 1991) was an English footballer who played in the Football League for Port Vale.

Career
Edge played for Stoke City before joining Potteries derby rivals Port Vale as an amateur, before signing as a professional 1960. After making his debut at Vale Park in a 2–1 win over Reading on 9 October 1961 he also played in the 3–1 defeat to Watford at Vicarage Road on 24 February. These were his only two Third Division appearances of the 1961–62 season for Norman Low, and he left on a free transfer in May 1962 and moved on to Crewe Alexandra. He signed with Cheshire County League side Macclesfield Town in March 1963 on a free transfer, and moved on to Stafford Rangers the following year.

Career statistics
Source:

References

1942 births
1991 deaths
People from Baddeley Green
Footballers from Stoke-on-Trent
English footballers
Association football forwards
Stoke City F.C. players
Port Vale F.C. players
Crewe Alexandra F.C. players
Macclesfield Town F.C. players
Stafford Rangers F.C. players
English Football League players